Elections to Adur District Council were held on 4 May 2000. One third of the council was up for election and the council stayed under no overall control. Overall turnout was 36.5%.

After the election, the composition of the council was:
Conservative 15
Labour 13
Liberal Democrat 9
Shoreham Beach Residents Association 2

Results

Ward results

References
BBC report of 2000 Adur election result

2000
2000 English local elections
2000s in West Sussex